EGU or eGU may refer to:
 E-Government Unit, of the Cabinet Office of the government of the United Kingdom
 Eagle Air (Uganda), a Ugandan airline
 English Golf Union, now merged into England Golf
 European Geosciences Union, an interdisciplinary science learned association 
 European Goldfields, a Canadian mining company
 Gnostic Church of France (
 Patrick Egu (born 1967), Nigerian American football player